Robert Jarczyk (born October 13, 1959 in Munich, Germany) is a German television actor.

References

External links

ZBF Agency Munich 

1959 births
Living people
Male actors from Munich
German male television actors
20th-century German male actors
21st-century German male actors